Atthis can be:

Atthis (mythology), in Greek myth, the daughter of Cranaus
Atthis (plural: Atthides), the traditional title for ancient historical works on Athenian history, written by an atthidographer
A woman mentioned in love poetry by Sappho
Atthis (genus) in the hummingbird family
Atthis (Obernewtyn character) in the Obernewtyn Chronicles, by Isobelle Carmody 
8975 Atthis, an asteroid